Barbara Ransby (born May 12, 1957) is a writer, historian, professor, and activist. She is an elected fellow of the Society of American Historians, and holds the John D. MacArthur Chair at the University of Illinois at Chicago.

Ransby attended Columbia University, where she graduated with a bachelor's degree in 1984, and completed her master's degree and PhD at the University of Michigan. In 1996, she joined the faculty of University of Illinois at Chicago, where she is professor of Black Studies and Gender and Women's Studies at the university. Ransby was elected president of the National Women's Studies Association for a two-year term, which began in November 2016. She is an historian of the Movement for Black Lives.

Ransby's academic work has featured biographies of 20th-century black women activists Ella Baker and Eslanda Robeson. In contemporary politics, she has been executive director of a non-profit organization. Her daughter Asha Rosa Ransby-Sporn is as of 2021 a national organizing co-chair of the non-profit youth organization BYP100.

In 1995, Ransby, together with other black feminists including Angela Davis, Evelynn Hammonds and Kimberlé Crenshaw, formed an alliance called the African American Agenda 2000 to oppose Louis Farrakhan's Million Man March, out of concern that it would further black male sexism.

Selected works

Books 

Ella Baker and the Black Freedom Movement: A Radical Democratic Vision (2003, UNC Press)
Eslanda: The Large and Unconventional Life of Mrs. Paul Robeson (2013, Yale Press)
Making All Black Lives Matter: Reimagining Freedom in the Twenty-First Century (2018, University of California Press)

Articles 
 "Suffocate Black Women Voices" (1991)

References

External links

1957 births
20th-century African-American people
21st-century African-American writers
21st-century American historians
African-American writers
Living people
University of Illinois Chicago faculty
University of Michigan alumni
Columbia University School of General Studies alumni